CJL or cjl may also refer to:

 Communauté Juive Libérale a Jewish community 
 Cultural jet lag
 Chitral Airport IATA code